Bangladesh University of Engineering and Technology, commonly known by the acronym BUET, is a public technological research university in Dhaka, Bangladesh. Founded in 1876 as the Dacca Survey School, it is the oldest institution for the study of engineering, architecture and urban planning in Bangladesh.

A large number of BUET alumni are active in notable engineering and non-engineering roles in Bangladesh and abroad.

History

Dacca Survey School was established in 1876 at Nalgola, west of the current Sir Salimullah Medical College campus, in Old Dhaka by the Government of Bengal under British Raj. It offered two-year engineering and survey courses toward the Sub-Overseer's examination, which certified land surveyors.

According to a report on public instruction in Bengal, on 31 March 1903, Dhaka Survey School had 117 students of which 103 were Hindus and 14 were Muslims. In 1908, the school started to offer diploma degrees. Nawab Sir Khwaja Ahsanullah Bahadur, a philanthropist and Nawab of Dhaka, endowed donations for developing the survey school. After his death in 1901, his son, the then Nawab of Dhaka, Sir Khwaja Salimullah Bahadur released the grant in 1902 in accordance with his late fathers wish. As an acknowledgement of this contribution, the school was renamed to Ahsanullah School of Engineering in 1908.

The school offered three-year diploma courses in civil engineering, electrical engineering and mechanical engineering in 1908. In 1912, the university was moved to its present premises. In 1938, A. K. Fazlul Huq, the then Prime Minister of Bengal, appointed Hakim Ali as the principal of the school.

After the partition of India in 1947, Chief Minister of East Bengal Sir Khwaja Nazimuddin approved the school to be upgraded to Ahsanullah Engineering College, as a Faculty of Engineering under the University of Dhaka, offering four-year bachelor's course in civil, electrical, mechanical, chemical and metallurgical engineering.

In 1948, the Government of East Bengal granted recognition to the engineering college. Ali became the first principal of the college. In 1951, TH Mathewman was appointed the next principal. M. A. Rashid succeeded him in 1954 as the first Bengali principal of the college and held the post until 1960. In 1956, a new course curriculum and the semester system were introduced at the college.

On 1 June 1962, in order to create facilities for postgraduate studies and research, the college was upgraded to East Pakistan University of Engineering and Technology (EPUET), becoming the fourth university of the then East Pakistan. Rashid was appointed the first vice-chancellor of the university.

A partnership with the Agricultural and Mechanical College of Texas (renamed Texas A&M University) was forged, and professors from A&M came to teach and formulate the curriculum. During this period, EPUET offered courses in mechanical, electrical, civil, metallurgical, and chemical engineering, and architecture.

After the liberation war of 1971, and Bangladesh's independence, EPUET was renamed to Bangladesh University of Engineering and Technology (BUET).

In 2002, a first year student in the chemical engineering department, Sony, was killed during a factional clash between two feuding groups of the Jatiyatabadi Chhatra Dal (JCD) at BUET. The two factions exchanged gunfire and she was caught in the line of fire.

In 2007, BUET celebrated 60 years (1947–2007) of engineering education in Bangladesh by arranging a 6-month-long series of programs and events.

In October 2019, sophomore Abrar Fahad was tortured and beaten to death in Sher-e-Bangla Hall, allegedly by members of the Bangladesh Chhatra League (BCL), the student wing of the ruling Awami League party. The Independent reported that beatings and torture by the BCL were common in the dormitories. Fahad's murder sparked nearly two months of student protests against violent ragging and bullying at the residence halls. The protests ended after university authorities met student demands. They expelled for life 25 students allegedly involved in the killing, expelled a further 15 from their places in Ahsan Ullah Hall, Suhrawardy Hall, and Titumir Hall, handed down various suspensions and warnings, and adopted new penalties for ragging and political activities.

In February 2021, BUET and Chinese multinational technology company Huawei signed a memorandum of understanding (MoU) to establish the first ICT Academy in Bangladesh on BUET campus.

On 21 June 2021, BUET and Saitama University, Japan signed second renewal of the agreement on academic exchange and the memorandum on student exchange between the two institutions. Saitama University (SU) and BUET have had a long-standing relationship for the past 20 years.

In January 2022, BUET was ranked 1st among Bangladeshi and 1589th among global educational institutions in the Webometrics Ranking of World Universities.

Academics

Campus 
BUET has an urban campus located in the Palashi area of Dhaka. The campus houses academic and administrative buildings, residential halls for students and other amenities.

Faculties and departments
Academic activities are undertaken by 18 departments under five faculties. Twelve departments offer undergraduate courses, all of which, except the Department of Humanities, offer postgraduate courses as well.

 Faculty of Architecture and Planning:
 Department of Architecture (Arch)
 Department of Urban and Regional Planning (URP)
 Department of Humanities (Hum)
 Faculty of Civil Engineering:
 Department of Civil Engineering (CE)
 Department of Water Resources Engineering (WRE)
 Faculty of Electrical and Electronic Engineering:
 Department of Electrical and Electronic Engineering (EEE)
 Department of Computer Science and Engineering (CSE)
 Department of Biomedical Engineering (BME)
 Faculty of Mechanical Engineering:
 Department of Mechanical Engineering (ME)
 Department of Industrial and Production Engineering (IPE)
 Department of Naval Architecture and Marine Engineering (NAME)
 Faculty of Engineering:
 Department of Chemical Engineering (ChE)
 Department of Materials and Metallurgical Engineering (MME)
 Department of Chemistry (Chem)
 Department of Mathematics (Math)
 Department of Physics (Phys)
 Department of Petroleum and Mineral Resources Engineering (PMRE)
 Department of Nanomaterials and Ceramic Engineering (NCE)

Institutes
At present, there are six institutes in BUET. These institutes offer postgraduate diplomas, master's and doctoral degrees.
 Institute of Water and Flood Management (IWFM)
 Institute of Appropriate Technology (IAT)
 Institute of Information and Communication Technology (IICT)
 Accident Research Institute (ARI)
 BUET-Japan Institute of Disaster Prevention and Urban Safety (BUET-JIDPUS)
 Institute of Nuclear Power Engineering (INPE)

Research centers
BUET has several research centres.
 Centre for Energy Studies (CES)
 Centre for Environmental and Resource Management (CERM)
 Biomedical Engineering Centre (BEC)
 Bureau of Research, Testing & Consultation (BRTC)
 International Training Network Centre (ITN)
 Bangladesh Network Office for Urban Safety (BNUS)

Directorates
 Directorate of Advisory, Extension and Research Services (DAERS)
 Directorate of Students' Welfare (DSW)
 Directorate of Planning and Development (P&D)
 Directorate of Continuing Education (DCE)

Journals and research bulletins
 Journal of Mechanical Engineering Research and Developments
 Chemical Engineering Research Bulletin
 Bangladesh Journal of Water Resources Research
 Electrical and Electronic Engineering Research Bulletin
 Protibesh (Research Journal on Architecture)

Rankings

BUET has been ranked 202nd among the Asian universities in the 2022 edition of QS World University Rankings. BUET has been ranked No. 801-1000 among all universities on QS World University Rankings 2023. Only three Bangladeshi universities have been ranked in the 2022 edition of Times Higher Education World University Rankings, BUET is one of them.

Library
BUET central library has a collection of 142,913 items of information materials. Among the materials, 125,066 and 17,847 are books and bound periodicals respectively. Besides, 152 titles are in the current subscription list of journals. Every year, 1500 volumes are added to this library. The main reading room of the central library can accommodate 200 students at a time to provide reading facilities of rare and out-of-print books, and also ready reference and prescribed textbooks. There are also departmental libraries in each of the departments and institutes and hall libraries in each of the residence halls.

Convocations 
After the independence of Bangladesh and the subsequent name change, the first convocation of the university was held in 1973. Since then, convocations have been held in 1976, 1992, 1993, 1997, 2001, 2004, 2005, 2006, 2011 and 2019.

Administration

The Chancellor is the ceremonial head of the university who appoints the Vice-chancellor. The position is held by the incumbent President of Bangladesh. The Vice-chancellor is the executive head of the university. The position is always held by a senior Professor of the university. The university is administered by the University Syndicate which is chaired by the Vice-chancellor.

Members of the Syndicate include Deans of several faculties, Director General of Secondary and Higher Education in Bangladesh, Director General of Technical Education in Bangladesh, eminent academics from this university as well as from other famous public universities. Each of the faculties is headed by a Dean and each of the departments is chaired by a Head of the department.

They are generally full professors from their respective faculties and departments. Institutes, Research Centers and Directorates are headed by the Directors who are full professors from relevant fields of research. Other major administrative posts include the Registrar, the Comptroller and the Controller of Exams.

The university has also the following Statutory Authorities.
 Academic Council
 Finance Committee
 Faculties
 Selection Boards
 Committee for Advanced Studies and Research (CASR)
 Planning and Development Committee
 Boards of Postgraduate Studies (BPGS)
 Boards of Undergraduate Studies (BUGS)

The University Syndicate is the supreme authority in major policy-making matters and in approving recommendations. The Finance Committee, the Planning and Development Committee and other committees assist the Syndicate in matters important for the proper functioning of the university. The Academic Council is the supreme body for formulating academic rules and regulations to which the CASR, Boards of Undergraduate and Postgraduate Studies and the Faculties recommend.

List of vice-chancellors 
Following is the complete list of the vice-chancellors.
 M. A. Rashid (1 June 1962 – 16 March 1970)
 Mohammed Abu Naser (16 March 1970 – 25 April 1975)
 Wahiduddin Ahmed (25 April 1975 – 24 April 1983)
 Abdul Matin Patwari (24 April 1983 – 25 April 1987)
 Musharrof Husain Khan (25 April 1987 – 24 April 1991)
 Muhammad Shahjahan (24 April 1991 – 27 November 1996)
 Iqbal Mahmud (27 November 1996 – 14 October 1998)
 Nooruddin Ahmed (14 October 1998 – 30 August 2002)
 Md. Alee Murtuza (30 August 2002 – 29 August 2006)
 A. M. M. Safiullah (30 August 2006 – 29 August 2010)
 S M Nazrul Islam (30 August 2010 – 13 September 2014)
 Khaleda Ekram (14 September 2014 – 24 May 2016)
 Saiful Islam (22 June 2016 – 25 June 2020)
 Satya Prasad Majumder (25 June 2020 – present)

Enrollment

Undergraduate 

The Undergraduate admission test is one of the most intensive written examinations in Bangladesh. After completion of higher secondary level (HSC) education, a student can submit her or his application for undergraduate admission if he/she fulfills the minimum requirements.

The students with the best grades in Mathematics, Physics, Chemistry, English & Bengali on their Higher Secondary School Certificate (HSC) examination are allowed to take the admission test. The screening process allows 20,000 students to sit for the admission test based on the cumulative sum of their GPA in those five subjects.

After the competitive admission test, only about 1,275 students get selected on the basis of merit and are offered admission. The admission test is of 600 marks, with 60 questions carrying 10 marks each. 20 questions are from physics, 20 from chemistry and 20 from mathematics.

There are 26 seats for foreign students at the undergraduate level. The pre-requisite qualification for admission is HSC or GCE A-level or its equivalent with high grades in Mathematics, Physics, and Chemistry. The admission fee is $200; the course registration fee is US$50 per credit hour and the approximate cost of food, lodging etc. is US$100 per month. A maximum of 10 students from a single country are allowed for admission.

Postgraduate
In Masters and PhD programs, around 1,000 graduate students are accepted on an annual basis. For admission to these programs, candidates are required to appear in interviews and/or written tests.

Postgraduate degrees offered by departments and institutes are MSc (Master of Science), MSc Engg. (Master of Science in Engineering), M. Engg (Master of Engineering), MURP (Master of Urban and Regional Planning), MArch (Master of Architecture), M.Phil. (Master of Philosophy) and PhD (Doctor of Philosophy). Postgraduate diplomas (PG. Dip.) are also offered in IT and Water resources development.

Research programs
For consultation and research the expertise at the university, its teachers and the laboratory facilities are available to other organizations of the country. A separate institution – Bureau of Research, Testing and Consultation (BRTC) has been formed to oversee these activities.

The university undertakes research programs sponsored by outside organizations like United Nations Organizations, Commonwealth Foundation, European Union, University Grants Commission (Bangladesh), World Bank, Asian Development Bank, DfID, JICA etc.

In the wake of the COVID-19 pandemic, BUET developed OxyJet, a cost-effective CPAP ventilator, which was approved by the Directorate General of Drug Administration (DGDA) in July 2021.

Conferences and workshops
BUET regularly organizes national and international conferences and workshops in its campus to enhance the research capabilities of its students and faculties. Among the conferences organized by BUET, following are notable:

Student life

Halls of residence

There are nine residence halls for BUET students. Most are named after eminent figures in the history of Bangladesh:
 Ahsanullah Hall (named after Nawab of Dhaka, Nawab Bahadur Sir Khwaja Ahsanullah)
 Titumir Hall (named after Bengali Muslim revolutionary Syed Mir Nisar Ali Titumir)
 Sabekun Nahar Sony Hall, Formerly Chattri Hall (Named after Sabekun Nahar Sony, who died being caught between gunfighting between political groups in BUET at 2002)
 Bangamata Sheikh Fojilatunnesa Mujib Hall, Named after Sheikh Fojilatunnesa Mujib , wife of Sheikh Mujibur Rahman, Father of The Nation of Bangladesh.
 Dr. M. A. Rashid Hall (named after M. A. Rashid, the first vice-chancellor of the university)
 Kazi Nazrul Islam Hall (named after the National Poet of Bangladesh Kazi Nazrul Islam)
 Sher-e-Bangla Hall (named after the 1st Prime Minister of Bengal- Sher-e-Bangla A. K. Fazlul Huq)
 Suhrawardy Hall (named after the Bengali-nationalist leader and 5th Prime-minister of Pakistan Huseyn Shaheed Suhrawardy)
 Shahid Smrity Hall (named in memory of martyrs of the Bangladesh Liberation War)
The administrative head of a residence hall is its provost, usually chosen from the senior teachers of different faculties. Three Assistant Provosts are also appointed in the hall administration.

Students who do not stay at halls of residence are facilitated by the university's own commuter buses which cover major routes of Dhaka city.

Sports facilities
BUET has a large playground at the eastern periphery of main academic campus. It is used as venue of annual athletics competition of the university as well as cricket, football, and hockey competitions. Students can access the facility all year round. Besides, visiting foreign national football teams as well as few top football clubs of Bangladesh sometimes use this ground for practice sessions. The playground is also used as venue of alumni reunions. BUET has tennis court in the main academic area. It also has a gymnasium near halls of residence where students can do gymnastics and play basketball during leisure.

Awards and achievements
 CSE, BUET students have achieved extraordinary feat since its participation at 1998 Atlanta ACM International Collegiate Programming Contest. BUET was the first University from Bangladesh as well as South Asia along with the North South University, Bangladesh to participate in World Finals of such an Prestigious Programming Competition. Best Ranking in ACM ICPC World Finals was 11.
Following is the position of BUET in ICPC over the years:

*AWC = Asia-West Champion ; HM = Unranked but Honourable Mention ; NQ = Not Qualified
 Teams from BUET became first and third around the globe in the inaugural International Conference on Acoustics, Speech, and Signal Processing in the 2014 IEEE Signal Processing Cup (SP Cup) at the ICASSP in 2014, and second and fifth place in IEEE SP Cup 2015 and again followed by the Grand Prize (1st place) in IEEE SP Cup 2016. Recently, teams from the EEE department are also participating in the IEEE Video and Image Processing Cup (IEEE VIP Cup) since 2017. In 2017 BUET achieved 1st and 3rd place in IEEE VIP cup among more than 200 teams around the world.
 BUET teams participated in the IEEE Myron Zucker Student Design Contest in 2001, placed first, Chicago, United States.
 Graduate alumnus of BUET was recognized by American Society of Civil Engineers as one of the 10 new faces of 2016 in Outstanding Projects and Leaders (OPAL) awards 2016.
 BUET teams participated in the Asia-Pacific Robot Contest ABU ROBOCON 2005 Beijing and was awarded the Panasonic Award.
 BUET student won the 2006 IEEE Region 10 Student Paper Contest.
 BUET won the Student Enterprise Award in 2007 from IEEE.
 BUET won the IEEE Vibrant Student Branch Award 2008 in IEEE Region 10 Student Congress in 2007 from IEEE. 
 BUET reached "partial double octo-final" round in open break category (44th among 400 teams) at the 36th World Universities Debating Championship 2016.
 A team from BUET became category champion in NASA apps contest in 2020.
 BUET's Mars Rover Team participated in the International Planetary Aerial System Challenge (IPAS) 2021 and was awarded the Innovation Award.

Notable alumni

See also
 List of dental schools in Bangladesh
 List of medical colleges in Bangladesh
 List of universities in Bangladesh
 University of Dhaka

References

External links

 The official website of BUET
 BUET Undergraduate Admission Information
 BUET Central Library
 BUET: The profiles of IEEE fellows
 Biomedical Engineering (BME) Department of BUET
 Civil Engineering (CE) Department of BUET
 Computer Science and Engineering (CSE) Department of BUET
 Electrical and Electronic Engineering (EEE) Department of BUET
 Mechanical Engineering (ME) Department of BUET
 Nanomaterials and Ceramic Engineering (NCE) Department of BUET
 BUET Institutional Information System (BIIS)
 BUET University all information
 BUET-Japan Institute of Disaster Prevention and Urban Safety (BUET-JIDPUS)

Bangladesh University of Engineering and Technology
Educational institutions established in 1876
1876 establishments in India
Technological institutes of Bangladesh
Public engineering universities of Bangladesh
Engineering universities and colleges in Bangladesh